Homāy-nāmeh is an epic poem in Persian language which relates the story of Homay daughter of Kay Bahman. Shahnameh contains a shorter version of this epic. Composed by an unknown author in 6th  century AH, Homāy-nāmeh contains 4,332 couplets and very few number of Arabic loanwords.

References

Epic poems in Persian
Persian mythology